This is a timeline of the development of and controversy over Israeli settlements. As of January 30, 2022 the West Bank settlement population was 490,493 and the settler population in the Golan Heights was almost 27,000 and in East Jerusalem the settler population was around 220,000.

1967 

 The cease-fire agreement following the 1967 Six-Day War leaves Israel in control of a number of areas captured during hostilities.
 From Jordan, Israel gains control of the West Bank, including East Jerusalem.
 From Egypt, Israel gains control of the Sinai Peninsula up to the Suez Canal, and the Gaza Strip.
 From Syria, Israel gains control of most of the Golan Heights, which since 1981 has been administered under the Golan Heights Law.
 The municipal borders of Jerusalem are extended to include all of the Old City as well as other areas. Residents within the new municipal borders are offered the choice between citizenship (subject to a few restrictions) and permanent residency (if they wished to retain their Jordanian passports). This annexation has never been recognized by any other country.
 The Sinai, Gaza Strip, and West Bank are put under Israeli military occupation. Residents are not offered citizenship or residency, though they typically have de facto work permits within Israel and freedom of travel there.

1972 

 Settler population. West Bank: 1,182. Gaza Strip: 700. East Jerusalem: 8,649. Golan Heights: 77. Total: 10,608.
 The West Bank settlement of Kiryat Arba is founded.

1975 
 The West Bank settlement of Ma'ale Adummim is founded.

1977 
 The West Bank settlements of Elkana, Beit El and Karnei Shomron are founded.

1978 

 Israel forcibly evacuates its citizens from the Sinai and demolishes their homes as the area is returned to Egypt pursuant to the Camp David Accords. The last Israeli community in the area, Yamit, is evacuated by early 1982.

August 

 The West Bank settlement of Ariel is founded.

1979

March 

 United Nations Security Council Resolution 446 is passed. The resolution states that it "Determines that the policy and practices of Israel in establishing settlements in the Palestinian and other Arab territories occupied since 1967 have no legal validity and constitute a serious obstruction to achieving a comprehensive, just and lasting peace in the Middle East". The resolution is passed 12 votes to 0 with 3 abstentions. This is the first of many such UN resolutions against the Israeli settlements.

1980 

 The Knesset asserts Jerusalem's status as the nation's "eternal and indivisible capital" by passing the Jerusalem Law.
 The UN declares the Jerusalem Law "null and void", and the Security Council in resolution 465 ordered Israel to dismantle the settlements.

1981

December 
 Israel extends its law to the Golan Heights, passing the Golan Heights Law, which grants permanent residency, ID cards, and Israeli citizenship to the residents, but does not formally annex the territory.

1983 

 Settler population. West Bank: 22,800. Gaza Strip: 900. East Jerusalem: 76,095. Golan Heights: 6,800. Total: 106,595.
 The West Bank settlement of Giv'at Ze'ev is founded.

1985 

 Settler population. West Bank: 44,100. Gaza Strip: 1,900. East Jerusalem: 103,900. Golan Heights: 8,700. Total: 158,700.
 The West Bank settlements of Betar Illit and Oranit are founded.

1989 

 Settler population. West Bank: 69,800. Gaza Strip: 3,000. East Jerusalem: 117,100. Golan Heights: 10,000 Total: 199,900.

1990 

 Settler population. West Bank: 78,600. Gaza Strip: 3,300. East Jerusalem: 135,000. Golan Heights: 10,600. Total: 227,500.

1991 

 Settler population. West Bank: 90,300. Gaza Strip: 3,800. East Jerusalem: 137,300. Golan Heights: 11,600. Total: 243,000.

1992 

 Settler population. West Bank: 101,100. Gaza Strip: 4,300. East Jerusalem: 141,000. Golan Heights: 12,000. Total: 258,400.

1993 

 Settler population. West Bank: 111,600. Gaza Strip: 4,800. East Jerusalem: 152,800. Golan Heights: 12,600. Total: 281,800.

1994 

 Israel begins work on the West Bank barrier.

1995 

 Settler population. West Bank: 133,200. Gaza Strip: 5,300. East Jerusalem: 157,300. Golan Heights: 13,400. Total: 309,200.

1996 

 Settler population. West Bank: 142,700-139,974. Gaza Strip: 5,600. East Jerusalem: 160,400. Golan Heights: 13,800. Total: 322,500.
 The West Bank settlement of Modi'in Illit is founded.

1997 

 Settler population. West Bank: 154,400-152,277. Gaza Strip: 5,700. East Jerusalem: 161,416. Golan Heights: 14,300. Total: 335,816.

1998 

 Settler population. West Bank: 163,300-164,800. Gaza Strip: 6,100. East Jerusalem: 165,967. Golan Heights: 14,900. Total: 350,267.

1999 

 Settler population. West Bank: 177,411-177,327. Gaza Strip: 6,337. East Jerusalem: 170,123. Golan Heights: 15,313. Total: 369,184.

2000 

 Settler population. West Bank: 192,976-190,206. Gaza Strip: 6,678. East Jerusalem: 172,250. Golan Heights: 15,955. Total: 387,859.

September 

 Al-Aqsa Intifada begins.

2001 

 Settler population. West Bank: 200,297.

2002 

 Settler population. West Bank: 214,722-211,416. Gaza Strip:7,277. East Jerusalem: 175,617. Golan Heights: 16,503. Total: 414,119.

2003 

 Settler population. West Bank: 224,669-223,954. Gaza Strip:7,556. East Jerusalem: 178,601. Golan Heights: 16,791. Total: 427,617.

April 

 Israel and the Palestinians agree to the Road map for peace plan, in which Israel undertakes to freeze settlement building in all the occupied territories to accompany unconditional cessation of violence by the Palestinians.

2004 

 Settler population. West Bank: 234,487-235,263. Gaza Strip:7,826. East Jerusalem: 181,587-176,566. Golan Heights: 17,265. Total: 441,828.
 The Israeli Government and Parliament approve the evacuation of the Israeli settlements from the Gaza Strip and four settlements from northern Samaria." Nurit Kliot, "Resettlement of Refugees in Finland and Cyprus: A Comparative Analysis and Possible Lessons for Israel", in Arie Marcelo Kacowicz, Pawel Lutomski. Population Resettlement in International Conflicts: A Comparative Study, Lexington Books, 2007, p. 57.

2005 

 Settler population. West Bank: 258,988-247,514. Gaza Strip:0. East Jerusalem: 184,057-178,913. Golan Heights: 17,793. Total: 460,838.

March 

 The Sasson report finds that Israeli state bodies have been discreetly diverting millions of shekels to build West Bank settlements and outposts that were illegal under Israeli law. The report exposes the existence of at least 150 such illegal outposts that lack proper government authorization.
 The Israeli government confirms plans to increase the size of the Maale Adumim settlement, in the West Bank near Jerusalem, by 3,500 homes. Chief Palestinian negotiator Saeb Erekat criticizes the move, saying "[This] sabotages all efforts seeking to get the peace process back on track," and "The Israeli government wants to determine Jerusalem's fate by presenting the settlements and wall as a fait accompli.".

August 

 All 21 settlements in the Gaza Strip and four in the northern West Bank (or northern Samaria) are forcibly evacuated as part of Israel's unilateral disengagement plan.

2006 

 Settler population. West Bank: 268,400-261,879. East Jerusalem: 181,823. Golan Heights: 18,105. Total: 461,807-468,328.

2007 

 Settler population. West Bank: 276,462 -282,000. East Jerusalem: 184,707. Golan Heights: 18,105. Total: 475,404.

November 

 Annapolis Conference is held. Palestinians demand settlement freeze as precondition for talks however Israel stands by plan to build new settlements in East Jerusalem.

December 

 Israel decides to build 300 more Israeli homes in the Har Homa neighborhood of East Jerusalem, near Bethlehem. The move is condemned by the United States and the European Union.

2008 

 West Bank settler population: 290,697.

March 

 The Jerusalem municipality announces plans to build 600 new housing units in East Jerusalem. US Secretary of State Condoleezza Rice states in response that settlement expansion should stop and was inconsistent with 'road map' obligations.

November 

 The Israeli Supreme Court gives the Israeli government 45 days to explain why it hasn't taken down the illegal outpost of Migron in accord with its commitments to the 2003 Road map for peace plan.

December 

 The Gaza War begins.

2009

January 

 The Gaza War concludes.

June 
 US President Barack Obama makes his famous Cairo speech in which he says "The United States does not accept the legitimacy of continued Israeli settlements".
 Israeli Defense Minister Ehud Barak authorizes the construction of 300 new homes in West Bank settlements.

August 
 US President Barack Obama demands a complete freeze on settlement construction in the West Bank, including East Jerusalem. The Israeli government agrees to a freeze in the West Bank. Peace Now argues that Israel is attempting to fool the United States.  On 25 August 2009 Netanyahu says that he will attempt to gain an agreement with the U.S. to continue building settlements before attempting to talk with the Palestinians. On 28 August 2009 US officials said they would not impose conditions on the parties, but that it would be up to the parties themselves to determine if the threshold for talks had been met.   Education Minister Gideon Sa'ar defended the freeze as an attempt to "protect the vital interests - Jerusalem and the relationship with the United States - and to avoid national isolation, because we won't be able to do the things close to our hearts while under international isolation."

September 
 Hamas leader Khaled Meshaal called Israel's proposal to temporarily halt settlement construction in exchange for improved relations with Arab countries "Dangerous", as he viewed it as an attempt to avoid US demands. The Hamas leader's opposition to the Israeli proposal was supported by Arab League Secretary General Amr Moussa.

November 
 The United States government voices their dismay at the approved by the Israel's interior ministry of 900 additional housing units at a Jewish settlement in East Jerusalem. A White House spokesman says the move makes it "more difficult" to revive Israeli-Palestinian peace talks. Settlements on occupied territory are considered illegal under international law, though Israel disputes this and consider Gilo, the planned settlement area "an integral part of Jerusalem".

December 
 The Israeli government orders a 10-month lull in permits for new settlement homes in the West Bank. The restrictions, which Israeli politicians and media have referred to as a "freeze", do not apply to East Jerusalem (whose de facto annexation by Israel is not recognised internationally), municipal buildings, schools, synagogues and other community infrastructure in the settlements. About 3,000 homes already under construction will be allowed to proceed. The Israeli government said the move was aimed at restarting peace talks, but Palestinian officials said it was insufficient. Palestinian officials have refused to rejoin peace talks until a total building halt is imposed, including in East Jerusalem. The announcement followed calls by the US government for a total freeze in settlement building. The US government, the European Union, Russia and the UN have criticized Israel's plans to continue building in East Jerusalem but both the US and the EU have stated that there should be no preconditions for resuming the suspended peace talks related to Israel's Road Map requirement to freeze settlements. although Palestinian participants would have to give prior acceptance of Israel's claim to statehood and refrain from violence.

2010

March 
 Israel announces plans to construct 1600 settler homes in the Ramat Shlomo settlement in East Jerusalem during United States Vice President Joe Biden's visit to the region. Biden condemns the decision saying "The substance and timing of the announcement, particularly with the launching of proximity talks, is precisely the kind of step that undermines the trust we need . . . and runs counter to the constructive discussions I've had in Israel."
 United Nations Secretary-General Ban Ki-Moon stated "The world has condemned Israel's expansion plans in East Jerusalem. Let us be clear: all settlement activity is illegal anywhere in occupied territory, and this must stop." He spoke both for the United Nations and the Middle East Quartet.
 The mayor of Jerusalem unveiled a plan to demolish 22 Israeli Arab homes in East Jerusalem to make way for a public park and tourist site.

2011

February 
The U.S. vetoes a draft resolution to condemn all Israeli settlements in Palestinian territory as illegal.

2017 

As of January 1, 2017 the West Bank settlement population was 420,899.

2020 

In 2020 the settler population in East Jerusalem was around 220,000.

2021 

In 2021 the settler population in the Golan Heights was almost 27,000

2022 

As of January 30, 2022 the West Bank settlement population was 490,493.

Notes 

 
Israeli–Palestinian conflict-related lists